The 2015 Western & Southern Open  was a men's and women's tennis tournament played on outdoor hard courts August 15–23, 2015. It was part of the ATP World Tour Masters 1000 of the 2015 ATP World Tour and of the WTA Premier 5 tournaments of the 2015 WTA Tour, as well as a 2015 US Open Series event. The 2015 tournament was the men's 114th edition and the women's 87th edition of the Cincinnati Masters. The tournament is held annually at the Lindner Family Tennis Center in Mason, Ohio (a northern suburb of Cincinnati), United States.

Roger Federer and Serena Williams were the defending champions and both successfully defended their titles.

Points and prize money

Point distribution

Prize money

ATP singles main-draw entrants

Seeds

 Rankings are as of August 10, 2015

Other entrants
The following players received wild cards into the main singles draw:
  Jared Donaldson
  Mardy Fish
  Bjorn Fratangelo
  Rajeev Ram

The following players received entry from the singles qualifying draw:
  Alexandr Dolgopolov
  Thanasi Kokkinakis
  Denis Kudla
  Lu Yen-hsun
  Nicolas Mahut
  Vasek Pospisil
  Alexander Zverev

The following player received entry as a lucky loser:
  Benoît Paire

Withdrawals
Before the tournament
  David Ferrer → replaced by  João Sousa
  Guillermo García López → replaced by  Gilles Müller
  Tommy Haas → replaced by  Jerzy Janowicz
  Juan Mónaco → replaced by  Jiří Veselý
  Kei Nishikori → replaced by  Benoît Paire

ATP doubles main-draw entrants

Seeds

 Rankings are as of August 10, 2015

Other entrants
The following pairs received wildcards into the doubles main draw:
  Eric Butorac /  Scott Lipsky
  Steve Johnson /  Sam Querrey

WTA singles main-draw entrants

Seeds

 Rankings are as of August 10, 2015

Other entrants
The following players received wild cards into the main singles draw:
  Daniela Hantuchová
  Alison Riske
  Maria Sharapova
  CoCo Vandeweghe

The following player received entry using a protected ranking into the main singles draw:
  Dominika Cibulková

The following players received entry from the singles qualifying draw:
  Tímea Babos
  Mona Barthel
  Kateryna Bondarenko
  Lauren Davis
  Casey Dellacqua
  Julia Görges
  Lucie Hradecká
  Ana Konjuh
  Christina McHale
  Yulia Putintseva
  Anna Karolína Schmiedlová
  Yaroslava Shvedova

The following player received entry as a lucky loser:
  Mirjana Lučić-Baroni

Withdrawals
Before the tournament
  Svetlana Kuznetsova (left lower leg injury) → replaced by  Tsvetana Pironkova
  Ekaterina Makarova (right lower leg injury) → replaced by  Varvara Lepchenko
  Maria Sharapova (right upper leg injury) → replaced by  Mirjana Lučić-Baroni

During the tournament
  Venus Williams (viral illness)

Retirements
  Victoria Azarenka (left thigh injury)
  Belinda Bencic (right wrist injury)

WTA doubles main-draw entrants

Seeds

 Rankings are as of August 10, 2015

Other entrants
The following pairs received wildcards into the doubles main draw:
  Madison Brengle /  Alexa Glatch
  Madison Keys /  Lisa Raymond
  Christina McHale /  CoCo Vandeweghe

Finals

Men's singles

  Roger Federer defeated  Novak Djokovic, 7–6(7–1), 6–3

Women's singles

  Serena Williams defeated  Simona Halep 6–3, 7–6(7–5)

Men's doubles

  Daniel Nestor /  Édouard Roger-Vasselin defeated  Marcin Matkowski /  Nenad Zimonjić, 6–2, 6–2

Women's doubles

  Chan Hao-ching /  Chan Yung-jan defeated  Casey Dellacqua /  Yaroslava Shvedova, 7–5, 6–4

References

External links

 Official website
 Association of Tennis Professionals (ATP) tournament profile